Sara is a 1976 American Western television series starring Brenda Vaccaro centering around a schoolteacher in Colorado in the 1870s. It aired from February 13 to May 7, 1976 on CBS.

After Sara ended, a television movie, Territorial Men, compiled from footage shot for the weekly series, was broadcast on July 30, 1976.

Synopsis

In the 1870s, young, unmarried schoolteacher Sara Yarnell decides to leave behind her dull, predictable life in Philadelphia, Pennsylvania, and move to the Western frontier, where she can face new challenges. Answering a newspaper advertisement for a schoolteacher, she settles in Independence, Colorado, where she becomes the only teacher in a one-room schoolhouse.

Strong-willed, she fights fiercely against ignorance and prejudice that she encounters in Independence, much to the dismay of some of the more conservative local residents, who had thought they were getting a far more passive schoolteacher. She also believes strongly that education is a necessity and a right – one of her first actions after arriving in Independence is to demand new readers and a new outhouse for the school – putting her at odds with local residents who view it as an unnecessary luxury.

Her stances and actions have differing effects on the various people in her life in Independence. They offend her landlady, Martha Higgins, and draw mixed responses from schoolboard members Emmett Ferguson, Claude Barstow, and George Bailey, who also is a banker in the town. However, her principles and goals receive the approval of the towns newspaper editor, Martin Pope, and of Saras friend Julia Bailey, who also is Georges wife, as well as of Saras students, which include Marthas daughters Debbie and Emma and George and Julias son Georgie.

Cast

Brenda Vaccaro...Sara Yarnell
Bert Kramer...Emmett Ferguson
Albert Stratton...Martin Pope
William Phipps...Claude Barstow
William Wintersole...George Bailey
Mariclare Costello...Julia Bailey
Louise Latham...Martha Higgins
Kraig Metzinger...Georgie Bailey
Debbie Lytton...Debbie Higgins
Hallie Todd...Emma Higgins
Albert Henderson...Samuel Higgins

Production

Michael Gleason created Sara, and George Eckstein was its executive producer. Richard J. Collins produced the show. Episode directors included William F. Claxton,  Lawrence Dobkin, Daniel Haller, Gordon Hessler, Alf Kjellin, Stuart Margolin, Leo Penn, Joseph Pevney, Michael Preece, Jud Taylor, and William Wiard. Writers included Gleason, Pietra Mazza, Robert Pirosh, Katharyn Michaelian Powers, Elizabeth Wilson, and Jerry Ziegman.  Lee Holdridge composed the shows theme song, "Saras Theme."

Sara was based on the novel The Revolt of Sarah Perkins by Marian Cockrell.

Brenda Vaccaro received a Primetime Emmy Award for Outstanding Lead Actress in a Drama Series nomination for her performance in Sara.

Broadcast history

Sara premiered on CBS on February 13, 1976. It drew low ratings and was cancelled after the broadcast of its twelfth episode on May 7, 1976.

On July 30, 1976, CBS broadcast a made-for-television movie, Territorial Men, compiled from footage shot for the weekly series.

Episodes 
Sources

References

External links
 https://www.imdb.com/title/tt0074051/?ref_=tt_ch

CBS original programming
Television series by Universal Television
1976 American television series debuts
1976 American television series endings
1970s Western (genre) television series
English-language television shows
Television series set in the 1870s
Television shows set in Colorado